Hendrik Petrus van Schoor (born ) is a South African rugby union player for the  in the Currie Cup and in the Rugby Challenge. His regular position is hooker.

References

South African rugby union players
Living people
1997 births
Rugby union players from Worcester, South Africa
Rugby union hookers
Golden Lions players
Pumas (Currie Cup) players
Lokomotiv Penza players
Western Province (rugby union) players
Griffons (rugby union) players